South Kordofan is one of the 18 wilayat or states of Sudan. It has an area of 158,355 km² and an estimated population of approximately 1,100,000 people (2000). Kaduqli is the capital of the state. It is centered on the Nuba Mountains. At one time it was supposed that South Kordofan was the only state in (North) Sudan suitable for producing oil, but oil has also been discovered in neighboring White Nile State in larger quantities.

Under the Comprehensive Peace Agreement, residents of South Kordofan were to hold popular consultations in 2011 to determine the constitutional future of the state. However, South Kordofan governor Ahmed Haroun suspended the process and violence followed. Haroun had previously been charged with war crimes against civilians and crime against humanity by the International Criminal Court.

History 

Although South Kordofan is part of Sudan, it is home to many pro-South Sudan communities, especially in the Nuba Mountains, some of whom fought alongside southern rebels during the long civil war.

In 2009 and 2010, a series of conflicts between rival nomadic tribes in South Kordofan caused a large number of casualties and displaced thousands.

On June 6, 2011 armed conflict broke out between the forces of Northern and Southern Sudan, ahead of the scheduled independence of the South on July 9. This followed an agreement for both sides to withdraw from Abyei. On June 20, the parties agreed to demilitarize the contested area of Abyei where Ethiopian peacekeepers were deployed. Abyei is currently controlled by the United Nations Interim Security Force for Abyei.

Districts of Southern Kordofan 

 Dilling District
 Rashad District
 Abu Jubaiyah District
 Talodi District
 Kadugli District

Cities and towns of Southern Kordofan 
Ed Dubeibat
Kaduqli (capital)

See also 
 Kordofan - overall region
 Eyes and Ears Of God – Video surveillance of Sudan - documentary film
 Nuba Mountains
 Languages of the Nuba Mountains
 Ghulfan people

References

External links
The Nuba Mountains Homepage

 
States of Sudan
Kurdufan